The N10 is a national route in South Africa connecting Gqeberha on the Eastern Cape coast with the Namibian border at Nakop, via Cradock, De Aar and Upington.

Route

Northern Cape
The N10 begins at Nakop in the Northern Cape, on the border with Namibia. On the Namibian side the road is known as the B3 Road. It begins by running east for 130 km to the city of Upington. After its intersection with the R360 (which provides a shorter and faster route south into Upington Central), the N10 continues eastwards up to the Upington Airport entrance (a t-junction), where it turns south and enters the Upington City Centre to meet the R360 again. At the Brug Street junction, the N10 meets the N14 and they are concurrent on Brug Street south-eastwards. At the junction with Scott Street, the N14 turns eastwards while the N10 turns southwards to cross the Orange River.

From Upington, the N10 follows the Orange River for 114 km east-south-east, through Grootdrink, to the town of Groblershoop, where it meets the western end of the N8 National Route from Kimberley. From the N8 junction, the N10 continues following the Orange River south-east for 133 km, through Marydale, to the town of Prieska.

From Prieska, the N10 continues south-east for 126 kilometres to Britstown, where it meets the N12 national route. The N10 and N12 routes are one road southwards for 3 km before the N10 becomes its own road south-eastwards just north of the Britstown city centre. The N10 proceeds eastwards for 43 km to bypass the town of De Aar, where it meets the R48 road. From De Aar, the N10 continues south-east for 59 km to reach the town of Hanover, where it meets the N1 national route. The N10 continues east-south-east for 62 km to enter the Eastern Cape and meet the N9 national route south of Noupoort.

Eastern Cape
The N9 and N10 routes are one road southwards for 24 kilometres into the town of Middelburg (bypassing the town centre to the east) before splitting south of the town centre, where the N10 continues south-eastwards. The N10 continues south-east for 95 kilometres, crossing the Great Fish River and following it, to the town of Cradock, where it meets the R61 road. The R61 and the N10 enter the town as one road, crossing the Great Fish River again, turning south as J.A. Calata Street, then east as Commissioner Street, then south-east as Hospital Street, before splitting north of the Lingelihle suburb. From Cradock, the N10 continues southwards for 80 km as the Daggaboers Nek, still following the Great Fish River, to the town of Cookhouse. Before Cookhouse, it meets the R63 road and they are one road into Cookhouse, before splitting east of the town centre.

From Cookhouse, the N10 follows the Great Fish River southwards for another 24 km as the Olifantskop Pass to the town of Middleton. The N10 continues southwards for another 88 km, through Paterson, to reach its southern terminus at an intersection with the N2 national route and the R72 road about 45 km north-east of Gqeberha (35 kilometres north-east of Coega; 12 kilometres north-east of Colchester).

References

External links

 South African National Roads Agency
 Route listing

National Roads in South Africa
Roads in South Africa